Up Close & Personal is Vicki Genfan's third available release. The double CD features the first disk of original instrumentals, titled Up Close, and a second, vocal-based disk, called Personal. Each disc contains a QuickTime video, showing clips of recording sessions and snapshots of Genfan as well as of the other recording artists. The double-CD features both Genfan's guitar virtuosity as well as her singer-songwriter abilities. Most of the songs are recorded with accompanying musicians.

Track listing

Disk 1, Up Close
 Atomic Reshuffle
 Let It Rain
 In A Mood
 Kali Dreams
 Luna Ahumada
 Joy
 Si
 New Grass
 Longest Night
 Catch Me
 Jamanolo

Disk 2, Personal
 Don't Give Up On Me
 Norwegian Wood (This Bird Has Flown) 
 Love Thing
 When You Are Winter
 What's Going On
 Ain't Got Love
 Living In The Country
 So What's It To Ya
 Carry Me Home
 Eleanor

Composing credits
All songs by Vicki Genfan, except
"Jamanolo" by Vicki Genfan & Manolo Badrena
"Norwegian Wood" (i.e. Norwegian Wood) by John Lennon & Paul McCartney
"Love Thing" lyrics by Meg Garvey
"What's Going On" by Marvin Gaye
"Ain't Got Love" by Chris Jones
"Living In The Country" by David Rumpler and Vicki Genfan
"What's It To Ya" by Vicki Genfan and Kim Loren
"Eleanor" by Vicki Genfan and Everett Bradley

Personnel
Vicki Genfan – acoustic guitar, electric guitar, synth guitar, bass guitar, mandolin, vocals, keys
Ian Melrose – acoustic guitar, electric guitar, synth guitar, Dobro, mandolin, low whistle, low whistle choir, shaker
Steve Jordan
Manolo Badrena – shakers, vocal chant, drums, percussion
Gil Goldstein – acoustic piano, Wurlitzer
Rob Paparozzi – harmonica
Daniel A. Wiess – Hammond organ
John Mettam – drums & percussion, glockenspiel
Jon Albrink – bass guitar
Bryant Wilder – bass guitar
Jess Willoughby – bass guitar
Barb Merjan – drums
Janelle Burdell – percussion, udu drum
Sonya Heller – vocals
Everett Bradley – vocals, loop
Jenn Hopper – vocals
Penny Mealing – vocals, shaker
Erika Luckett – vocals
Kerstin Blodig – vocal Ker-pad, acoustic guitar
Ian Melrose – producer
Vicki genfan, Tay Hoyle – co-producers
Tay Hoyle, Dae Bennet, Brian Dozoretz  – recording engineers
Tay Hoyle, Ian Melrose – mixing

References

2006 albums
Vicki Genfan albums